Jochen Neerpasch (born March 23, 1939 in Krefeld, Germany) is a former German racecar driver and motorsports manager.

Career
His racing career began in the 1960s, first on Borgward touring car, then with the 1964 24 Hours of Le Mans as a first major event. Racing a Porsche 907, he won the 1968 24 Hours of Daytona. After his third-place finish in Le Mans the same year, he retired from racing.

In the 1970s, he became a successful manager in the Deutsche Rennsport Meisterschaft and the European Touring Car Championship. First he managed Ford, then he took the 1972 champion Hans-Joachim Stuck with him to BMW, to found the successful BMW M team and company.

In the 1980s, Neerpasch was in charge of Sauber-Mercedes sports car racing team, winning the 24 Hours of Le Mans in 1989. He also discovered and taught talents like Michael Schumacher, Karl Wendlinger, and Heinz-Harald Frentzen.

Racing record

Complete 24 Hours of Le Mans results

Complete 24 Hours of Daytona results

Complete 12 Hours of Sebring results

Complete Targa Florio results

External links
Driver DB Profile

Auto racing crew chiefs
German racing drivers
1939 births
Living people
Sportspeople from Krefeld
24 Hours of Le Mans drivers
Racing drivers from North Rhine-Westphalia
World Sportscar Championship drivers
European Touring Car Championship drivers

12 Hours of Reims drivers
Porsche Motorsports drivers